The Son Also Rises may refer to:

 The Son Also Rises (book), a 2014 non-fiction book by Gregory Clark

Television episodes
 "The Son Also Rises" (Battlestar Galactica)
 "The Son Also Rises" (Dynasty)
 "The Son Also Rises" (Grimm)
 "The Son Also Rises" (Invasion)
 "The Son Also Rises" (L.A. Law)
 "The Son Also Rises" (Minder)
 "The Son Also Rises", an episode of Tripping the Rift

See also 
 The Sun Also Rises (disambiguation)